electroCore, Inc. (Nasdaq: ECOR) is a medical technology company based in Basking Ridge, New Jersey. electroCore was co-founded in 2005 by JP Errico Thomas J. Errico, MD, Charles Theofilos, MD, and Peter Staats, MD. The current chief executive officer is Daniel S. Goldberger. electroCore has one product called gammaCore, a non-invasive, commercially available product that uses vagus nerve stimulation.

On March 27, 2020, electroCore announced a common stock purchase agreement of up to $25 million with Chicago-based institutional investor Lincoln Park Capital Fund, LLC.

Products

gammaCore Sapphire CV 
In July 2020, the FDA gave an emergency COVID-19 authorization for gammaCore Sapphire CV, a vagus nerve stimulation device, aimed at reducing exacerbations in people potentially affected by the novel coronavirus and have difficulty breathing due to asthma.

References 

Medical technology companies of the United States
Companies based in Somerset County, New Jersey
American companies established in 2005
2005 establishments in New Jersey